Clytie  is a genus of moths in the family Erebidae. The genus was erected by Jacob Hübner in 1823.

Species
Subgenus Clytie 

Clytie arenosa 
Clytie delunaris 
Clytie devia 
Clytie euryphaea 
Clytie gracilis 
Clytie gyulaii 
Clytie haifa 
Clytie illunaris 
Clytie micra 
Clytie omana 
Clytie rungsi 
Clytie sabaea 
Clytie sancta 
Clytie scotorrhiza 
Clytie sublunaris 
Clytie syriaca 
Clytie terrulenta 
Clytie tropicalis 

Subgenus Hypoglaucitis 
Clytie distincta 
Clytie infrequens

References

Ophiusini
Moth genera